Hyongmyong sinmun ('Revolution Newspaper') was a communist newspaper published from Seoul, Korea in the fall of 1945. It was an organ of the 'Changan' faction of the Communist Party of Korea.

References

Korean-language newspapers
Newspapers published in Korea
Communist newspapers
Communism in Korea
Newspapers established in 1945
Mass media in Seoul
1945 establishments in Korea